Corina Katt Ayala, known mononymously as Corina, is an American singer-songwriter and actress. She released her self-titled album on Atco Records in 1991, and charted a string of dance hits in the U.S. between 1989 and 1997. The highest charting of these was the summer 1991 hit "Temptation", which peaked at No. 6 on the U.S. Billboard Hot 100.

Biography

Early life
Corina Katt Ayala was born to Puerto Rican parents in Spanish Harlem, New York and raised in South Bronx. In her teens, she became Miss Hispanic America and became runner-up for Miss Puerto Rico. Ayala spent years of formal training in ballet, voice, and theatre before landing a contract with Cutting Records, going under the name "Corina".

Music career
Corina released her debut single "Out of Control" in 1987. A year later, her second single "Give Me Back My Heart" peaked at No. 26 on the Billboard Hot Dance Music/Club Play charts. In 1991, Corina released her self-titled debut album through Atco Records. The lead single, "Temptation" became her biggest hit, peaking at No. 6 on the U.S. Billboard Hot 100. Corina toured the U.S. as a support act for Ice Cube, Boyz II Men, and Marky Mark and the Funky Bunch.

Acting career
Corina made some guest starring roles on All My Children, One Life to Live, As the World Turns, New York Undercover, and Cosby. She also starred alongside Marc Anthony in the 1990 film East Side Story. She was selected by director Tim Robbins to portray Frida Kahlo in the 1999 film Cradle Will Rock.

Corina also wrote, produced, and starred in the one-woman shows Fear & All of Me and Voices in My Head. She also wrote, directed, and starred in the sitcom pilot Latin in America. More recently, Corina created the web series Lupita Says on her YouTube channel.

Discography

Studio albums

Singles

References

External links

Living people
Year of birth missing (living people)
21st-century American singers
21st-century American women singers
American actresses of Puerto Rican descent
American dance musicians
American freestyle musicians
American Latin pop singers
American musicians of Puerto Rican descent
American women pop singers
American women singer-songwriters
Atco Records artists
Dance-pop musicians
Hispanic and Latino American actresses
Hispanic and Latino American musicians
Hispanic and Latino American women singers
Singers from New York City
Singer-songwriters from New York (state)
Spanish-language singers of the United States
Women in Latin music